|}

The Renaissance Stakes is a Group 3 flat horse race in Ireland open to thoroughbreds aged three years or older. It is run at the Curragh over a distance of 6 furlongs (1,207 metres), and it is scheduled to take place each year in September.

The event was formerly known as the MacDonagh Boland Stakes. It used to be contested over 7 furlongs, and for a period it held Listed status. It was promoted to Group 3 level in 1998, and cut to 6 furlongs in 2001.

The race was called the Ridgewood Pearl Stakes in 2003, in honour of the successful filly Ridgewood Pearl. It was given its present title when a different Ridgewood Pearl Stakes was introduced in 2004. It was switched to an August fixture at the Curragh in 2014 when the Irish Champions Weekend fixture was established, switching places in the calendar with the Flying Five Stakes. In 2016 the race moved to a date in late September.

Records
Most successful horse since 1987 (2 wins):
 Wizard King – 1995, 1997
 Bewitched – 2010, 2011
 Art Power -  2021, 2022 
 
Leading jockey since 1987 (3 wins):
 Pat Smullen – Major Force (1999), Social Harmony (2000), Benbaun (2007)
 Johnny Murtagh – Polar Way (2002), Bewitched (2010, 2011)

Leading trainer since 1987 (2 wins):
 Vincent O'Brien – King's College (1987), Mysterious Ways (1994)
 Kevin Prendergast – Lady Eileen (1988), Millie's Choice (1993)
 Sir Mark Prescott – Wizard King (1995, 1997)
 Dermot Weld – Major Force (1999), Social Harmony (2000)
 Charles O'Brien – Bewitched (2010, 2011)
 Michael Halford - Snaefell (2009), Russian Soul (2013)
 Aidan O'Brien - Beauty Bright (2006), The Happy Prince (2016)
 Karl Burke - Quiet Reflection (2017), Unfortunately (2018)
 Tim Easterby -  Art Power (2021,2022)

Winners since 1987

See also
 Horse racing in Ireland
 List of Irish flat horse races

References
 Racing Post:

 galopp-sieger.de – Renaissance Stakes.
 ifhaonline.org – International Federation of Horseracing Authorities – Renaissance Stakes (2019).
 pedigreequery.com – Renaissance Stakes – Curragh.

Flat races in Ireland
Curragh Racecourse
Open sprint category horse races